Coronavirus HKU15, sometimes called Porcine coronavirus HKU15 (PorCoV HKU15) is a virus first discovered in a surveillance study in Hong Kong, China, and first reported to be associated with porcine diarrhea in February 2014. In February 2014, PorCoV HKU15 was identified in pigs with clinical diarrhea disease in the U.S. state of Ohio. The complete genome of one US strain has been published. Since then, it has been identified in pig farms in Canada. The virus has been referred to as Porcine coronavirus HKU15, Swine deltacoronavirus and Porcine deltacoronavirus.

See also
 Porcine epidemic diarrhea virus

References

Deltacoronaviruses
Animal viral diseases
Swine diseases